Nathan John Elder (born 5 April 1985) is an English former professional footballer who is assistant manager of Hythe Town. He played in the Football League for Brighton & Hove Albion, Brentford, Shrewsbury Town and Hereford United.

Career

Early years 
Elder was born in Hornchurch. He first played football while attending Langtons Infant School in his hometown Hornchurch, starting out as a defender. His first club was Sunday league side Barns Sports, before moving up to Isthmian League Division Three side Hornchurch. Moves up through the echelons of the Isthmian League to Barking & East Ham United, Aveley and Billericay Town followed. While he appeared sparingly for Billericay Town between 2004 and 2007, he scored prolifically, scoring 36 goals in 26 league appearances for the club.

Brighton & Hove Albion 
Elder joined Brighton & Hove Albion on 1 January 2007, after the "Seagulls" paid his former club Billericay Town £10,000 after being impressed with his talent during a match for Isthmian League Billericay against non-League rivals Worthing.

At Brighton, Elder found first-team opportunities under Dean Wilkins very difficult. During his time there he only started three games, two in League One and one in the Football League Trophy, scoring just twice for the club in total.

Brentford 
On 31 January 2008, Elder joined Brentford for £35,000. He scored an own goal on his debut for Brentford against Mansfield Town after just 15 minutes (though the goal was later credited to Mansfield player Michael Boulding), but scored the winner as Brentford eventually won 3–2. Elder won a 2008–09 League Two championship medal with the Bees, but his season was ended early after suffering a double fracture of the cheekbone, a fractured eye socket, severe trauma to the eyeball and extensive bleeding in and around the eye in a "horror clash" with Rotherham United's Pablo Mills in a match on 7 March 2009. In the days following the incident, Elder had no sight in his left eye and Brentford manager Andy Scott called for justice to be done. On 12 March, it was reported that the FA would be unable to take disciplinary action against Mills. Elder recovered sufficiently to be included in the squad for the final match of the season against Luton Town, but he remained an unused substitute and would not play again for the club. He revealed in April 2009 that the vision in his left eye would never be 100% again.

Shrewsbury Town 
On 3 August 2009 he signed for Shrewsbury Town on a three-year deal for an undisclosed fee. However Elder was then transfer listed on 9 November 2009, with manager Paul Simpson unhappy with a performance in the 1–0 FA Cup loss at home to non-League club Staines Town.

Return to non-League football 
On 15 January 2010, Elder joined Conference Premier club AFC Wimbledon on loan until the end of the 2009–10 season. The day after he signed, Elder scored his debut goal in AFC Wimbledon's 2–0 home win against Mansfield Town and picked up the man of the match award. He made a total of 18 appearances for the Dons and scored three goals. Shortly before he was due to return to Shrewsbury, Elder picked up an injury in a game at Tamworth. It was later discovered that he had suffered a tear of his anterior cruciate ligament and would be out for at least six months. It was announced on 24 June 2011 that he was to be released.

After being released by Shrewsbury, Elder was signed by Conference Premier side Hayes & Yeading United.

On 30 September, Elder signed on a monthlong loan deal with League Two side Hereford United before permanently signing on 6 January 2012. His first goal for the club was a glancing header in the 66th minute against Barnet, this would effectively be the winner as Hereford won the match 1–0.

On 6 July 2012, he was signed by Ebbsfleet United.

On 17 June 2013, Elder was signed by Dover Athletic on a free transfer. On 10 May 2014, Elder scored the only goal of the game in Dover's 1–0 playoff final win over former club Ebbsfleet United to seal Dover's return to the Conference Premier for the first time since 2002.

Having spent much of the previous season out on loan, including finishing the season with Tonbridge Angels, Elder joined the club permanently following his release from Dover in May 2015.

Elder joined Isthmian League South East Division club Sittingbourne as player-coach in August 2018 and was promoted into the role of assistant manager in February 2019.

In September 2019, Elder left to Sittingbourne to link up with his former Maidstone team-mate Steve Watt, as his assistant manager at Hythe Town.

Personal life 
Elder attended Langtons Infant School and Emerson Park Comprehensive. He stated that Andy Cole was the player he modelled himself on. Prior to becoming a professional footballer, he worked as an instructor in a gym. After leaving professional football, he worked in recruitment at Leadenhall Market.

Career statistics

Honours
Brentford
Football League Two: 2008–09

Dover Athletic

 Conference South play-offs: 2014

References

External links

1987 births
Living people
Footballers from Hornchurch
English footballers
Hornchurch F.C. players
Barking & East Ham United F.C. players
Aveley F.C. players
Billericay Town F.C. players
Brighton & Hove Albion F.C. players
Brentford F.C. players
Shrewsbury Town F.C. players
AFC Wimbledon players
Hayes & Yeading United F.C. players
Hereford United F.C. players
Ebbsfleet United F.C. players
Dover Athletic F.C. players
Maidstone United F.C. players
Tonbridge Angels F.C. players
English Football League players
National League (English football) players
Isthmian League players
Association football forwards
Sittingbourne F.C. players
Black British sportsmen